Muhammad al-Rudani (c. 1627 – 1683) was a Moroccan polymath who was active as an astronomer, grammarian, jurist, logician, mathematician and poet.

Biography 

He was of Shilha origin. After studying in his hometown at the Great Mosque of Taroudant and its Madrasa, he continued his studies in the Zaouia Nasiriyya under Mohammed ibn Nasir for four years, the Zaouia of Dila, in Marrakesh and in Fez. His teachers in Morocco were: the theologian Isa al-Sugtani (d.1651), the chronologist Muhammad ibn Said al-Marghiti (d. 1679), and the grammarian Muhammad al-Murabit al-Dilai' (d. 1678). Afterwards, he left to study in the Islamic east. Thus, in the early 1650s, he stayed in Algiers, where he studied under the logician Said ibn Ibrahim Qaddura. In Egypt and the Levant, he studied under Ali al-Ajhuri, Shihab al-Din al-Khafaji, Shihab al-Din al-Qaliyubi, Muhammad ibn Ahmad al-Shubri, al-Shaikh Sultan, Khayr al-Din al-Ramli, Muhammad al-Naqib ibn Hamza al-Hasani and Ibn Balban. He got an ijazah from all of these scholars. He spent most of his life in Ottoman territories. He is especially well known for the invention of a spherical device into which another sphere (painted blue) with a different axis was placed. This second sphere was divided into two parts in which the zodiacal signs with their sections and regions were drawn.

He died in Damascus on October 31, 1683.

Works 
Some of his works are:

 Silat al-khalaf bi-mawsūl al-salaf, an extensive record of the various chains of certifications he had received
 Bahjat al-tullāb fı̄ l-'amal bil-asturlāb, a treatise on the astrolabe
 Maqāsid al-'awālı̄ bi-qalā'id al-la'ālı̄, a didactic poem on ilm al-mı̄qāt (chronology) with a prose commentary
 al-Nāfi'a 'alā l-āla al-jāmi'a completed in 1661, a treatise describing the spherical astrolabe that he had constructed.
 Jam' al-fawā'id min Jāmi' al-usūl wa Majma' al-zawā'id, a compilation of hadith

References

Sources
 
 
 
 

1627 births
1683 deaths
17th-century Berber people
17th-century Moroccan people
Berber writers
Moroccan writers
Moroccan astronomers
People from Taroudannt
Scientists who worked on qibla determination
Shilha people